Eleazer Root (March 6, 1802July 25, 1887) was an American educator and Episcopalian priest from New York, who moved to Wisconsin as a young man and spent much of his career and adult life there. He served a term in the Wisconsin Assembly and was appointed as the first Superintendent of Public Instruction. Because of his health, in his last years he moved to St. Augustine, Florida, serving as rector of Trinity Parish from 1874 to 1884. Root is considered as one of the founding fathers of Wisconsin and was also instrumental in organizing the University of Wisconsin as a member of the first board of regents.

Early life and education
Born in Canaan, New York, Root graduated from Williams College. He was admitted to the New York bar. After moving briefly to Virginia, Root moved to Waukesha, Wisconsin Territory, where he helped found the present Carroll University. Root took Holy Orders in the Episcopal Church and was ordained to the priesthood.

In 1847, Root served in the second Wisconsin Constitutional Convention and was responsible for authoring Article X of the present Wisconsin Constitution. Largely unchanged to this day, Article X provides for a uniform system of public schools, creates the elected office of Superintendent of Public Instruction to supervise public instruction in every school district, establishes a state university at the seat of government, and prescribes principal and restricted uses to Wisconsin's school trust funds. From 1849 until 1852, Root was appointed and served as the first Superintendent of Public Instruction of Wisconsin. Root was a member of the Whig Party.

In 1852, Root was elected and served a term in the Wisconsin State Assembly. He also served as superintendent of schools in Fond du Lac County, Wisconsin. He then moved to Texas and taught languages in Guadalupe County, Texas, until he returned to Wisconsin after the start of the American Civil War.

For a time, Root lived in St. Louis, Missouri. Because of his health, he moved to St. Augustine, Florida, where he served as rector of Trinity Parish from 1874 to 1884. He died in Jacksonville, Florida.

Notes

External links

People from Canaan, New York
People from St. Augustine, Florida
Clergy from St. Louis
People from Guadalupe County, Texas
People from Fond du Lac County, Wisconsin
Politicians from Waukesha, Wisconsin
Williams College alumni
Carroll University faculty
New York (state) lawyers
Educators from Wisconsin
American Episcopal priests
Members of the Wisconsin State Assembly
1802 births
1887 deaths
Superintendents of Public Instruction of Wisconsin
19th-century American politicians
19th-century American lawyers
19th-century American Episcopalians
19th-century American clergy